Mahdi Kheyl (also Romanized as Mahdī Kheyl) is a village in Dasht-e Sar Rural District, Dabudasht District, Amol County, Mazandaran Province, Iran. At the 2006 census, its population was 926, in 219 families.

References 

Populated places in Amol County